Andreas Haider-Maurer (born 22 March 1987) is a retired professional tennis player from Austria.

In the first round of the 2010 US Open, he forced world No. 5 Robin Söderling to a fifth set before losing the match. That same year, Haider-Maurer reached the final of his home tournament in Vienna. He lost to compatriot, defending champion and top seed Jürgen Melzer.

In late 2015, Haider-Maurer suffered a right heel injury and it eventually turned out that he missed the whole 2016 season. He retired in January 2019 after 3 years of injury problems.

Haider-Maurer won 9 Challenger events and reached a career-high singles ranking of world No. 47 in April 2015.

ATP career finals

Singles: 1 (1 runner-up)

Singles performance timeline

Current through the 2018 French Open.

References

External links
 
 
 
 
 

Austrian male tennis players
People from Zwettl
Living people
1987 births
Sportspeople from Lower Austria